David L. Beatty (December 3, 1798 – February 21, 1881) was the fifth Mayor of Louisville, Kentucky serving from 1841 to 1844. He was born to early settlers in Bourbon County, Kentucky and raised by his grandparents in Jefferson County, Kentucky. At 17 he moved to Louisville to work as a machinist, and was an iron foundry foreman 3 years later. He founded a steam-engine business in 1829, which dissolved in 1837.

He served on the city council from 1839 to 1840 and elected mayor in 1841. Highlights of his administration included the establishment of the State Institute for the Blind in Louisville and construction of a waterworks. He is buried in Cave Hill Cemetery.

References

1798 births
1881 deaths
Mayors of Louisville, Kentucky
Burials at Cave Hill Cemetery
19th-century American politicians